Shah Baig Line is a residential neighbourhood in Lyari, located in the Karachi South district of Karachi, Pakistan.

There are several ethnic groups in Shah Baig Line including, Kutchis Muhajirs, Sindhis, Punjabis, Kashmiris, Seraikis, Pakhtuns, Balochis, Memons, Bohras and Ismailis.

References

External links 
 Karachi website - Archived

Neighbourhoods of Karachi
Lyari Town